Underfist: Halloween Bash (otherwise known as Underfist) is an American animated spin-off special of The Grim Adventures of Billy & Mandy. It originally aired on Cartoon Network on October 12, 2008. The special was going to be the setup for a new series spin-off of Grim & Evil, but the contract of Maxwell Atoms with Cartoon Network expired before moving to Disney Channel for the TV series Fish Hooks, and the special was ultimately the finale of the Grim & Evil franchise.

Plot 
On Halloween night, Irwin, Billy, Mandy, and Grim are trick-or-treating, Billy is a witch, Mandy and Grim are the Spanish Inquisition who burn witches and vampires and Irwin is Dracula, king of the vampires. Billy, Mandy, and Grim decide to go home after having no success with Dracula, who rudely hands them pennies. Irwin realizes that his life is passing him by. Mindy (secretly turned into a witch by an evil marshmallow bunny named Mr. Bun Bun) fools Irwin into opening an Underworld portal releasing an army of evil candy warriors and Bun Bun, where they start terrorizing the neighborhood. Irwin gets attacked and contacts Hoss Delgado, who helps him with the battle. The warriors take down Hoss with soda-candy guns, which if Hoss gets sticky, he gets a rash. When they kill Skarr's winning purple pansies, he comes out of his garage with a robot (spoof of the film Aliens), joining the battle. Soon it's an all out war, with no mercy, no rules, no nothing. Mindy again tricks Irwin, but this time, pretending she is being kidnapped by Mr. Bun Bun, taking her into the Underworld.

When the candy level gets to high, Hoss clicks his car unlock system, which a giant saw car (spoof of the Gotengo from Godzilla: Final Wars) comes drills out of the ground. They escape and start to plot their attack to the Underworld.

Soon they find a portal to the Underworld in the rain, which Hoss and Irwin jump in first (because he does not trust monsters and says to Skarr that he doesn't trust one eyed weirdos), but the portal turns off, because it is controlled by a diamond, which Mindy (in her witch form) smashes. The candy warriors try to sacrifice Hoss, by pushing him into hot coco, but they want to leave Irwin alive. This is because he has the powers of a mummy, being half mummy from his mother, which they need to keep the balance of the Underworld in place, and to become stronger warriors to eat the trick-or-treaters.

Mindy creates a potion which turns all the warriors into Candy Hunting Trick or Treater Candy Monsters, and all she needs now is Irwin's powers to create the candy warriors ultimate monster form. But Irwin refuses. Soon Jeff the Spider, Fred Fredburger, and Skarr find out a way how to get to the Underworld by using Hoss's car to drill into the Underworld, and they rescue Irwin and Hoss.

But the army of candy monsters hasn't given up yet. They head to the city and attack. Irwin and Hoss get into an argument, leading into a battle, turning on each other. While the battle is going on, the monsters suck up Irwin's power (but not all of it) and transform into one giant candy monster. Jeff and Fred try to escape, but they fail. Soon Hoss and Irwin see the monster and start to fight it, beating it. Irwin discovers that Hoss is scared of monsters, because he was haunted as a kid. In a rare moment of emotion for himself (and the franchise itself), Hoss apologizes to Irwin for how he treated him and realizes there are good monsters out there. Mindy also realizes what she did was wrong and apologizes as well. 

Just then, Mr. Bun Bun and Skarr (who is secretly working for him) appears and admits that he was the one who turned Mindy into a witch using a Witch Worm and used her to get to Irwin so he could use his powers to open up portals to the Underworld. He also reveals that he cut off Fred's tusks, made Billy scared of spiders, and haunted Hoss's childhood. Just as Bun Bun is about to kill Mindy and Underfist, Skarr betrays Bun Bun and kicks him into hot cocoa, melting the marshmallow bunny.

Grim, Billy, and Mandy (who became president) award Underfist for saving Halloween, but then they hear something outside and investigate. It's soon revealed that there is an army of squid warriors who have found their way to the surface world that the team made while trying to escape from the Underworld.

Characters and cast 
 Vanessa Marshall – Irwin
 Armin Shimerman – Skarr, Candy Skeleton, Rat
 Maxwell Atoms – Jeff the Spider
 Diedrich Bader – Hoss Delgado
 C. H. Greenblatt – Fred Fredburger
 Dave Wittenberg – Mr. Bun Bun
 Rachael MacFarlane – Mindy
 Grey DeLisle – Mandy, Aunt Sis
 Greg Eagles – Grim, Sperg, Candy Bar, Pumpkin
 Richard Steven Horvitz – Billy, Harold
 Phil LaMarr – Dracula, Bougersnatch
 Martin Jarvis – Nergal

Production 
Maxwell Atoms started production on Underfist shortly after he finished with The Grim Adventures of Billy & Mandy. The special was finished several months before it aired, but as it was a Halloween special, it was delayed until October. Cartoon Network did not pay for a permanent crew for a single film, so much of the work was done freelance or by Atoms himself. The film also used a different overseas animation crew at Digital eMation.

The special did not become a series due to the fact that Cartoon Network’s president at the time Stuart Snyder chose to focus on new ideas, which included live–action. This move resulted in long-time creators for the network such as Atoms, Mr. Warburton, and Craig McCracken to leave the network. Atoms later claimed on his personal Tumblr in 2021 that his decision to leave the network was not voluntary, as the special resulted in his firing by Michael Ouweleen for "ruining Cartoon Network's brand" with his gross out humor.

Reception
Underfist tied for first in ratings for the week it was aired and was nominated for Best Animated Television Production for Children in the 36th Annie Awards. The special won character designer Andy Suriano the Primetime Emmy Award for Outstanding Individual Achievement in Animation at the 61st Primetime Emmy Awards in 2009. Jacob Paschal of Toon Zone gave the film a negative review, saying "Overall, Underfist is your typical annual Halloween film fluff designed to fill the airwaves and get younger folk hyped on something other than candy. Maybe you'll find that enough".

References

External links
 
 

2008 television films
2008 films
Animated television specials
Cartoon Network television films
American television series finales
The Grim Adventures of Billy & Mandy films
Television films as pilots
Television pilots not picked up as a series
American films about Halloween